It Doesn't Matter may refer to:

 It Doesn't Matter (album), by The Underdog Project, 2000
"It Doesn't Matter" (Five Finger Death Punch song)
"It Doesn't Matter" (September song)
"It Doesn't Matter" (Wyclef Jean song)
"It Doesn't Matter", a song by The Chemical Brothers from Dig Your Own Hole
"It Doesn't Matter", a song by Depeche Mode from Some Great Reward
 "It Doesn't Matter", a version of the Manassas song performed by Firefall from Firefall
"It Doesn't Matter", a song by Tony Harnell from Sonic Adventure and its sequel
"It Doesn't Matter", a song by Alison Krauss from So Long So Wrong 
 "It Doesn't Matter", a song by Manassas from Manassas
 "It Doesn't Matter", a song by Ratt from Dancing Undercover
 "It Doesn't Matter", a song by Spyro Gyra from Morning Dance

See also
 It Don't Matter (disambiguation)
 "It Doesn't Matter Anymore", a song by Paul Anka
 It Doesn't Matter Anymore (album), an album by The Supernaturals
 Doesn't Matter Anyway (EP), an EP by Savatage
 "Doesn't Really Matter", a song by Janet Jackson
 "It Doesn't Really Matter", a song by Platinum Blonde from Standing in the Dark
"It Doesn't Matter Two", a song by Depeche Mode from Black Celebration